Shaun Higgins (born 4 March 1988) is a former professional Australian rules footballer who played in the Australian Football League (AFL). Higgins played for the Western Bulldogs from 2006 to 2014, the North Melbourne Football Club from 2015 to 2020 and the Geelong Football Club from 2021 to 2022. Higgins is a dual Syd Barker Medallist and was selected in the 2018 All-Australian team. He received a nomination for the 2007 AFL Rising Star award in round 8 of the 2007 season.

Early life
Higgins was raised in Geelong, Victoria and attended St Joseph's College. He played junior football for Newtown & Chilwell Football Club and was a  supporter. His father Mick played reserves football for Geelong.

Higgins was the Geelong Falcons' best onballer and was projected to be a top-ten selection in the 2005 AFL draft, but fell to pick 11, the 's first selection.

AFL career

Western Bulldogs (2006–2014)
He managed to make his debut in his first season, against Collingwood. He played mostly as a small forward then but suffered a season-ending elbow injury in round 13 against the West Coast Eagles, ruling him out of that year's finals campaign. Before his injury he showed flashes of brilliance in front of goals. But his fitness levels were not quite up. But even at that stage he was a standout with his accurate kicking and awareness of what was around him.

With the frustration of missing his first season, This was Higgins' breakout year after coming off a season ending elbow injury. He proved a handy Goal Kicker up forward that could take a good mark and set up players for a Goal. This was the year where the doubters got off his back and found out just how good he really was, and proved what kind of prospect he is. The game most notable was against the team he made his debut against, Collingwood where he kicked the Winning Goal. He was the Round 8 nominee for the 2007 NAB Rising Star award.

With a great win against Adelaide to open the season Higgins played a vital role in the win. His Season was cut short in round 2 with a Broken Ankle against Melbourne when he landed on it coming down from a Marking contest.  It was only supposed to keep him our for a few weeks but the injury was worse than first thought.  But came back to play in the Finals.  Higgins learned a valuable lesson that year and it has made him a better Footballer.  When he was injured he was always in the Bulldogs rooms encouraging his team mates and this was the first sign of Leadership that he shown and he later was voted by his peers as a leader.  In the preliminary Final against , Higgins was playing on Darren Milburn, Higgins went on to kick two goals on him and set one up and Milburn got taken off the ground.

Although he is primarily a forward, Higgins has been used sometimes in the midfield. In 2009 Higgins was promoted into the Leadership group. And he received the famous number 7 that was worn by Scott West and Doug Hawkins before him. Higgins had a brilliant pre-season that was up there with Daniel Cross and Matthew Boyd in the time trials. He is touted as being a potential captain of the Club. He had a solid 2009 season but had hamstring troubles that put a damper on his performance.  He has the ability of kicking both feet and has great speed.  His most notable goal was against Geelong. He is a very fit onballer that can run all day. He signed a contract extension midway through the season.

North Melbourne (2015–2020)
On 3 October 2014, Higgins signed with the North Melbourne Football Club as a restricted free agent after the Western Bulldogs decided not to match the Kangaroos' offer. Higgins had a stellar first season with North Melbourne, playing 24 games and kicking 39 goals. Higgins was also one of their most consistent players all year playing as a high half forward. The 2016 season however, was not one to remember for Higgins as he injured himself in round 7, thus ruling him out for three months. Higgins returned in round 23 and played in the losing elimination final.

Higgins played every match for the 2017 season apart from the round five match against  to go on and win his first best and fairest, the Syd Barker Medal. At the end of the 2019 season, Higgins signed a one-year contract extension, turning his back on interest from Geelong.

Geelong (2021–2022)
At the conclusion of the 2020 season, Higgins was asked to look elsewhere by North Melbourne to secure his future and accepted a two-year deal at Geelong; he was traded for pick 30 in that year's draft.

Statistics

|-
| 2006 ||  || 19
| 5 || 3 || 3 || 36 || 24 || 60 || 14 || 9 || 0.6 || 0.6 || 7.2 || 4.8 || 12.0 || 2.8 || 1.8 || 0
|-
| 2007 ||  || 19
| 20 || 26 || 10 || 127 || 120 || 247 || 74 || 38 || 1.3 || 0.5 || 6.4 || 6.0 || 12.4 || 3.7 || 1.9 || 1
|-
| 2008 ||  || 19
| 7 || 4 || 6 || 45 || 52 || 97 || 20 || 18 || 0.6 || 0.9 || 6.4 || 7.4 || 13.9 || 2.9 || 2.6 || 0
|-
| 2009 ||  || 7
| 20 || 32 || 18 || 231 || 191 || 422 || 105 || 52 || 1.6 || 0.9 || 11.6 || 9.6 || 21.1 || 5.3 || 2.6 || 11
|-
| 2010 ||  || 7
| 17 || 17 || 8 || 185 || 158 || 343 || 63 || 52 || 1.0 || 0.5 || 10.9 || 9.3 || 20.2 || 3.7 || 3.1 || 1
|-
| 2011 ||  || 7
| 18 || 12 || 16 || 205 || 173 || 378 || 80 || 70 || 0.7 || 0.9 || 11.4 || 9.6 || 21.0 || 4.4 || 3.9 || 1
|-
| 2012 ||  || 7
| 19 || 22 || 16 || 195 || 146 || 341 || 81 || 57 || 1.2 || 0.8 || 10.3 || 7.7 || 17.9 || 4.3 || 3.0 || 0
|-
| 2013 ||  || 7
| 3 || 3 || 4 || 30 || 11 || 41 || 17 || 10 || 1.0 || 1.3 || 10.0 || 3.7 || 13.7 || 5.7 || 3.3 || 0
|-
| 2014 ||  || 7
| 20 || 9 || 4 || 212 || 196 || 408 || 72 || 64 || 0.5 || 0.2 || 10.6 || 9.8 || 20.4 || 3.6 || 3.2 || 2
|-
| 2015 ||  || 4
| 24 || 39 || 26 || 233 || 236 || 469 || 104 || 90 || 1.6 || 1.1 || 9.7 || 9.8 || 19.5 || 4.3 || 3.8 || 8
|-
| 2016 ||  || 4
| 9 || 11 || 5 || 67 || 83 || 150 || 34 || 31 || 1.2 || 0.6 || 7.4 || 9.2 || 16.7 || 3.8 || 3.4 || 1
|-
| 2017 ||  || 4
| 21 || 18 || 25 || 269 || 224 || 493 || 77 || 106 || 0.9 || 1.2 || 12.8 || 10.7 || 23.5 || 3.7 || 5.0 || 9
|-
| 2018 ||  || 4
| 20 || 14 || 16 || 281 || 267 || 548 || 66 || 58 || 0.7 || 0.8 || 14.1 || 13.4 || 27.4 || 3.3 || 2.9 || 15
|-
| 2019 ||  || 4
| 17 || 10 || 11 || 222 || 261 || 483 || 64 || 49 || 0.6 || 0.6 || 13.1 || 15.4 || 28.4 || 3.8 || 2.9 || 18
|-
| 2020 ||  || 4
| 17 || 4 || 1 || 186 || 177 || 363 || 63 || 50 || 0.2 || 0.1 || 10.9 || 10.4 || 21.4 || 3.7 || 2.9 || 2
|-
| 2021 ||  || 4
| 18 || 4 || 12 || 157 || 177 || 334 || 80 || 49 || 0.2 || 0.7 || 8.7 || 9.8 || 18.6 || 4.4 || 2.7 || 1
|-
| 2022 ||  || 4
| 5 || 1 || 1 || 41 || 42 || 83 || 15 || 19 || 0.2 || 0.2 || 8.2 || 8.4 || 16.6 || 3.0 || 3.8 || 0
|- class=sortbottom
! colspan=3 | Career
! 260 !! 229 !! 182 !! 2722 !! 2538 !! 5260 !! 1029 !! 822 !! 0.9 !! 0.7 !! 10.5 !! 9.8 !! 20.2 !! 4.0 !! 3.2 !! 70
|}

Notes

Personal life
In November 2015, Higgins married partner Heidi Greig. They have a daughter named Rosie who was born in April 2018. In February 2021, the couple welcomed twins, a daughter named Emmeline and a son named Harry.

Honours and achievements
 All-Australian team: 2018
 Syd Barker Medal: 2017, 2018
 Australia representative honours in International Rules Football: 2017
 Victoria representative honours in State of Origin for Bushfire Relief Match
 AFL Rising Star nominee: 2007

References

External links

 
 

1988 births
Living people
Western Bulldogs players
North Melbourne Football Club players
Australian rules footballers from Victoria (Australia)
Geelong Falcons players
St Joseph's Football Club players
Syd Barker Medal winners
Australia international rules football team players
All-Australians (AFL)
Geelong Football Club players